Central Jamia Mosque Ghamkol Sharif is a Sunni mosque in Small Heath area of Birmingham, England.

The website Muslims in Britain classifies the Ghamkol Shariff Masjid as Sufi – Bareilvi.

Construction began on 15 March 1992, during Ramadan. Each night throughout its construction, a hafiz recited the Quran on the construction site. Building work ended in 1996. It can fit up to 5,000 people at one time.

The Masjid is named after a Sufi saint's place of residence, Ghamkol Sharif near Kohat, in northern Pakistan. Sufi saint Zinda Peer Sahib has followers in several countries, especially in the UK.

See also
Birmingham Central Mosque
Islam in the United Kingdom
Islamic schools and branches
Islamism
List of mosques in the United Kingdom

References

External links
 Official website

1996 establishments in England
Mosques in Birmingham, West Midlands
Barelvi mosques
Mosques completed in 1996